Mount Walsh is a mountain in Kluane National Park and Reserve in Yukon, Canada.

The peak was named after a RCMP superintendent for the Yukon Territory, James Morrow Walsh.


See also

List of mountain peaks of North America
List of mountain peaks of Canada

References

External links

Walsh
Walsh
Kluane National Park and Reserve